Slavko Župčić (born 1970) is a Venezuelan psychiatrist and writer. He was born in the northern city of Valencia, the son of a Croatian father who had migrated to Venezuela in the 1950s. Zupcic has a PhD from the Universidad Autónoma de Barcelona. He has published several novels and short story collections. He has also written books for children. His work has appeared in English translation.

In 2007, Zupcic was named as one of the best young writers in Latin America by the Hay Festival Bogota (see Bogota39).

References

1970 births
Venezuelan psychiatrists
Venezuelan male writers
Venezuelan people of Croatian descent
Living people
Autonomous University of Barcelona alumni